Aglaé-Geneviève-Eurélie Cadet de Gassicourt, known as Aglaé Cadet (c. 1738 – 1801) was a French enamelist and painter of miniatures.

Born in Paris, Cadet was the daughter of lawyer Jean-Pierre Joly, and was supposedly a distant relation of the marquis de Marigny; her family claimed a portion of his estate at one time. In 1761 she became the second wife of Claude-Antoine Cadet de Gassicourt. Their daughter Marie-Aglaé, later married to printseller Julien-François Fatou, became a miniaturist like her mother. A second daughter, Rosalie-Louise, having divorced her first husband, became the wife of the marquis de Montalembert, while a third, Henriette-Thérèse, married Jean-Baptiste Weyler, who is believed to have been her mother's instructor. The couple had three other daughters, and also had six sons. Mme. Cadet, named a peintre de la reine in 1787, was best known for her work in miniature and enamel, though a single pastel, similar in composition to those produced by Weyler, is known. At the Paris Salon of 1791 she showed a portrait of Jacques Necker; she is also known to have produced an enamel of Maurice de Saxe, after a work by Jean-Étienne Liotard, in 1789. Five of her enamels were in the collection of the 5th Duke of Aumont.

References

1730s births
1801 deaths
French women painters
French enamellers
Women enamellers
18th-century French painters
18th-century enamellers
18th-century French women artists
Painters from Paris